Motorway 12 is an extension of Motorway 1 that serves the city of Volos and it is also used as a beltway around the city. Despite having two lanes in each direction, there are some signalized intersections, meaning that not all parts are built to motorway standards.

Volos' Ring Road 
Volos Ring Road begins in Dimini and ends in Agria, crossing the city of Volos. It crosses Nea Ionia from north in the neighborhoods of Hiliadou and Kallithea. Even not all of the initial plan of the Ring Road is not completed yet, it has greatly reduced travel times for those wishing to bypass the congestion in downtown Volos. The Ring Road's current termini are the end of Larisa Street and in Agria village.
Motorways in Greece